Robert G. Martin is an American academic administrator. He served as president of Southwestern Indian Polytechnic Institute from 1989 to 1999. He later became president of Haskell Indian Junior College where he worked for ten years. From 2001 to 2005, Martin was president of Tohono Oʼodham Community College. He was associate head of the American Indian Studies Programs at University of Arizona. In May 2007, he was named president of the Institute of American Indian Arts. He is a member of the Cherokee Nation.

References 

Heads of universities and colleges in the United States
University of Arizona faculty
Cherokee Nation academics
Native American academics
Year of birth missing (living people)
Living people
21st-century Native Americans